Silanization is the covering of a surface with organofunctional alkoxysilane molecules. Mineral components like glass and metal oxide surfaces can all be silanized, because they contain hydroxyl groups which attack and displace the alkoxy groups on the silane thus forming a covalent -Si-O-Si- bond. The goal of silanization is to form bonds across the interface between mineral components and organic components present in paints, adhesives, etc. Silanization (or siliconization) of glassware increases its hydrophobicity and is used in cell culturing to reduce adherence of cells to flask walls.

Aside from clear applications in coatings and material science, the silanization process is also used in biomedical fields to anchor DNA to substrates.

Properties
Organofunctional alkoxysilane molecules have both organic and inorganic properties. Silanized surfaces are usually hydrophobic, but the surface properties can be adjusted by varying the side chains of the silane compound. Many common silane compounds have alkyl groups (containing only carbon and hydrogen) which are more nonpolar than the hydroxyl (-OH) groups on the untreated surface, creating a hydrophobic surface.

Once the surface has been functionalized, further reactions can be performed to graft molecules with properties such as hydrophilicity, hydrophobicity, self cleaning, photocatalytic, and more onto the substrate.

Mechanism
  Silanization begins with activating the desired material to expose surface hydroxyl (-OH) groups. The activated substrate, or material, is then placed in a silane solution to react; often, chlorosilanes are used due to their extreme reactivity. The silane is linked to the oxygen in the hydroxyl group, producing hydrochloric acid and a stable Si-O bond. This reaction occurs spontaneously and no catalyst is needed.

Organofunctional alkoxysilanes
The alkoxy groups usually used are the methoxy (-OCH3) and the ethoxy (-OCH2CH3) groups. The organofunctional alkoxysilanes are classified according to their organic functions:

Aminosilanes
The organic function is a primary or secondary amine:
APTES (3-aminopropyl)-triethoxysilane CAS# 919-30-2

APDEMS (3-aminopropyl)-diethoxy-methylsilane
APDMES (3-aminopropyl)-dimethyl-ethoxysilane
APTMS (3-aminopropyl)-trimethoxysilane CAS# 13822-56-5

Glycidoxysilanes
The organic function is an epoxide:
GPMES (3-glycidoxypropyl)-dimethyl-ethoxysilane

Mercaptosilanes
The organic function is a thiol:
MPTMS (3-mercaptopropyl)-trimethoxysilane
MPDMS (3-mercaptopropyl)-methyl-dimethoxysilane

References

Silicon